Lorenzo High School or Lorenzo Secondary School is a public high school located in Lorenzo, Texas (USA) and classified as a 1A school by the UIL. It is part of the Lorenzo Independent School District located in far west central Crosby County. In 2015, the school was rated "Met Standard" by the Texas Education Agency.

Athletics
The Lorenzo Hornets compete in the following sports:

 Basketball
 Cross Country
 6-Man Football
 Golf
 Tennis
 Track & Field

Notable Alumnus

Joe Reed - San Francisco 49ers quarterback attended Lorenzo High.

References

External links
Lorenzo ISD
List of Six-man football stadiums in Texas

Public high schools in Texas
Public middle schools in Texas